Hapoel HaDarom Tel Aviv was an Israeli football club based in Tel Aviv. The club reached the final of the 1937 Palestine Cup, where they lost 0–3 to their parent club, Hapoel Tel Aviv. The club later reformed and played at the lower tiers of the Israeli league until it merged in 1961 with Hapoel Kiryat Shalom.

History
The club, a farm club of Hapoel Tel Aviv, was formed in 1936. Hapoel HaDarom played in the 1936 Palestine Cup, where they drew 1–1 with Maccabi Hasmonean Jerusalem. The 1936 Palestine Cup was eventually stopped after only three matches were played, due to the outbreak of the 1936–39 Arab revolt.

In the 1937 Palestine Cup, Hapoel HaDarom defeated Maccabi Avshalom Petah Tikva 5–2 in the Quarter-finals and qualified for the Semi-finals, where they faced Maccabi Tel Aviv. Hapoel HaDarom upset Maccabi Tel Aviv with a 2–1 victory, to set a meeting with its parent club, Hapoel Tel Aviv in the final. The victory was assisted by a punishment issued to the senior Maccabi Tel Aviv squad for boycotting Maccabi's match against Aris Thessaloniki in April 1937. Due to the punishment, Maccabi had to field its youth team for the match. In the final, Hapoel HaDarom were defeated 0–3 by Hapoel Tel Aviv.

After the Israeli Declaration of Independence, the club had reformed at the beginning of the 1957–58 season, and was placed in Liga Gimel. At the end of the 1959–60 season, Hapoel HaDarom were promoted to Liga Bet, the third tier of Israeli football at the time, after they finished at the top four of the Promotion play-offs for Liga Gimel clubs. In 1961, a mixed team of Hapoel HaDarom and Hapoel Kiryat Shalom played in a training match against the Israeli national team, in which they lost 0–8. The two clubs merged prior to the 1961–62 season, to form Hapoel HaDarom Kiryat Shalom, a name which was used until the 1963–64 season, in which it was dropped and Hapoel Kiryat Shalom continued as a separate club in the following season and onwards.

References

HaDarom Tel Aviv
Football clubs in Tel Aviv
HaDarom Tel Aviv
Association football clubs established in 1936
1936 establishments in Mandatory Palestine
Association football clubs disestablished in 1961
1961 disestablishments in Israel